Shëngjin may refer to the following places in Albania:

Shëngjin, a coastal town in Lezhë municipality, Lezhë County
Shëngjin, Tirana, a village in the municipality of Shëngjergj, Tirana County
Shëngjin i Vogël, a village in the municipality of Zall-Bastar, Tirana County